H2L2 (for three decades, officially Harbeson, Hough, Livingston & Larson) is an architecture firm in Philadelphia founded in 1907 by Paul Philippe Cret as The Offices of Paul Philippe Cret.  In 1923, John Harbeson became Cret's partner, along with William J. H. Hough and William Livingston. In 1925 the firm was joined by Roy Larson.  After Cret's death in 1945, the younger partners followed Cret's wishes and removed Cret's name from their masthead, continuing as Harbeson, Hough, Livingston & Larson.  In 1976, the firm officially became H2L2 after years of using the name informally.  In 2012, H2L2 and NELSON, which was founded in 1977 as an interior design firm, merged to create a full-service architecture/engineering firm.

Much of the firm's work is visible in Philadelphia and around the country.

Major works

The Offices of Paul Philippe Cret 

 1910 – Organization of American States Building, Washington, DC (with Albert Kelsey) 
 1913 – Indianapolis Central Public Library, Indianapolis, Indiana (with Zantzinger, Borie and Medary)
 1921 – Detroit Institute of Arts, Detroit, Michigan (with Zantzinger, Borie and Medary)
 1923 – Barnes Foundation, Merion, Pennsylvania 
 1926 – Rodin Museum, Philadelphia, Pennsylvania (with Jacques Gréber 
 1926 – Benjamin Franklin Bridge, Philadelphia – Camden, New Jersey
 1929 – Clark Memorial Bridge, Louisville, Kentucky
 1929 – Integrity Trust Company Building, Philadelphia
 1932 – Folger Shakespeare Library, Washington D.C.
 1935 – Duke Ellington Bridge, Washington D.C.
 1937 – Eccles Building, Washington D.C.
 1944 – Bancroft Hall, USNA, Annapolis, Maryland

Harbeson, Hough, Livingston & Larson 

 1944 – Normandy American Cemetery and Memorial, Colleville-sur-Mer, Normandy, France
 1956 – Eisenhower Chapel, Penn State University, State College, Pennsylvania
 1957 – Walt Whitman Bridge, Philadelphia, Pennsylvania
 1958 - Welsh Valley Middle School, Narberth, Pennsylvania
 1963 – Thomas Jefferson University, General Plan, Philadelphia
 1965 – Rayburn House Office Building, Washington, DC
 1970 – Thomas Jefferson University, Scott Memorial Library, Philadelphia
 1970 – PECO Building, Philadelphia
 1972 – Children's Hospital of Philadelphia, Philadelphia
 1972 - University City High School (Philadelphia)
 1976 – Hetzel Student Union, Penn State University, State College
 1976 - Congregation Mikveh Israel, Philadelphia

References

External links

Architecture firms based in Pennsylvania
Companies based in Philadelphia
Organizations established in 1907
1907 establishments in Pennsylvania